Deconstruction is a philosophical theory.

Deconstruction or Deconstructed may also refer to:

Music

Albums
 Deconstructed (Bush album), a 1997 compilation album
 Deconstructed (EP), an EP by Kesha
 Deconstructed (Steve Swallow album), 1997
 Dconstructed, a Disney remix album
 Deconstruction (Meredith Brooks album), a 1999 album by Meredith Brooks
 Deconstruction (Cloroform album), a 1998 album by Cloroform
 Deconstruction (Deconstruction album), an eponymous album released by the rock band Deconstruction in 1994
 Deconstruction (Devin Townsend Project album), a 2011 album by the Devin Townsend Project
 The Deconstruction, a 2018 album by Eels

Songs
 "Deconstruction" (song), a song by the band Pitchshifter from their 1992 album Submit
 "Deconstruction", the sixth song on the Nevermore's 1999 album, Dreaming Neon Black

Other uses in music
 Deconstruction (band), a rock band formed by former members of Jane's Addiction
 Deconstruction Records, a UK record label
 Deconstruction Tour, a trans-European punk tour and sports festival
 Deconstructed club, an experimental electronic dance music genre

Other uses
 Deconstruction (building), the process of manually taking down a building
 Dimensional deconstruction, a method in theoretical physics to construct d-dimensional theories that behave as higher-dimensional theories in a certain range of energies
 Faith deconstruction, a phenomenon within American evangelicalism

See also
 Construction (disambiguation)
 Deconstructivism, an architectural movement or style
 Positive deconstruction, a methodology in Christian apologetics